Rincon Intermediate School is a public school (grades 7–8) in West Covina, California.

School overview
Rincon Intermediate School was one of 22 schools in the Rowland Unified School District but it is now closed and renamed Telesis Academy of Science and Math

See also
List of high schools in California

References

External links
http://www.rinconroadrunners.org/

Public middle schools in California